is a Japanese reality television series in the Terrace House franchise set in Karuizawa of the Nagano prefecture in Japan. It premiered on Netflix Japan as a Netflix Original on December 19, 2017. It is a Netflix and Fuji Television co-production which is also broadcast on Fuji TV in Japan, first through Fuji on Demand (FOD) on January 16, 2018 and on-air broadcast on January 22, 2018.

Cast

Main cast 

*Age when they first joined Terrace House.

Timeline

Guest appearances

Episodes

Season 1 (2017-18)

Season 2 (2018)

Season 3 (2018-19)

References

External links 
Official website
Terrace House: Opening New Doors on Netflix
Official YouTube channel 

Japanese reality television series
Fuji TV original programming
Japanese-language Netflix original programming